The Turfan volcano (also the volcano of Ho-tscheu or Bischbalik) is a volcano near the city of Turpan, Xinjiang. It lies within the Flaming Mountains 

Eruptions were recorded during the Song Dynasty, with reports of "frequent smog from the volcano on cloudless days and a nighttime blaze like a torch" in around 1120.

References

Volcanoes of China
Landforms of Xinjiang